Maya is a town in the Central Region of Uganda. It is one of the urban centers in Wakiso District.

Location
Maya is located in Maya Parish, Nsangi sub-county, Busiro County, Wakiso District, in Uganda's Central Region. The coordinates of Maya are: 0°15'59.0"N, 32°26'09.0"E (Latitude:0.266389; Longitude:32.435833).

Overview
Maya is located in Wakiso District, one of the fastest growing districts in Uganda. This area is attractive to those looking for land to build residential houses, schools and commercial buildings. Maya is an area, in relative proximity to Kampala, situated on a major highway, where land prices are relatively affordable. This has also increased the number of land disputes in the area.

Population
The Uganda Bureau of Statistics estimated the population of Maya at 3,100, in 2009.

Points of interest
The following points of interest are found within the town limits or near the town boundaries: (a) The offices of Maya Town Council (b) Maya Central Market (c) Fiduga Flower Plantation, a horticultural growing and exporting enterprise (d) International Paramedical Institute (e) The Kampala–Masaka Road - The highway passes through town in a northeast to southwest direction (e) London College of St. Lawrence, a private, mixed, residential high school.

See also
Nsangi
Wakiso
List of floriculture companies in Uganda

References

External links
Map of Maya Parish, Nsangi Sub-county, Wakiso District, Central Region, Uganda

Wakiso District
Populated places in Central Region, Uganda